The men's shot put event at the 1999 Summer Universiade was held at the Estadio Son Moix in Palma de Mallorca, Spain on 10 July.

Medalists

Results

Qualification
Qualification: 18.00 (Q) or at least 12 best performers (q) advance to the final

Final

References

Athletics at the 1999 Summer Universiade
1999